Joppiesaus is a condiment from the Netherlands based on mayonnaise with mild curry spices. It is commonly offered in fast food restaurants in the Netherlands and Belgium, but is also available in grocery stores.

Origin
Joppiesaus was created by Janine "Joppie" de Jager of Annie's Snackbar in Glanerbrug, a village in the Netherlands on the border with Germany. It comprises mayonnaise with a 'secret blend' of spices. In 2002 the sauce entered industrial production by Elite Salades & Snacks, a company in Neede, who legally own the sauce's name.

Ingredients and flavour
Joppiesaus is a vegetable oil-based mayonnaise with onion and curry powder spices. The flavour is akin to that of a mild curry mayonnaise and the colour a vivid turmeric yellow. The sauce is commonly served with french fries and other deep-fried or fast food dishes.

See also

Belgian sauces
 List of sauces

References

External links
Official website of Joppiesaus

Brand name condiments
Dutch cuisine
Enschede